
Categorical logic is the branch of mathematics in which tools and concepts from category theory are applied to the study of mathematical logic. It is also notable for its connections to theoretical computer science. 
In broad terms, categorical logic represents both syntax and semantics by a category, and an interpretation by a functor.  The categorical framework provides a rich conceptual background for logical and type-theoretic constructions. The subject has been recognisable in these terms since around 1970.

Overview 

There are three important themes in the categorical approach to logic:
Categorical semantics Categorical logic introduces the notion of structure valued in a category C with the classical model theoretic notion of a structure appearing in the particular case where C is the category of sets and functions. This notion has proven useful when the set-theoretic notion of a model lacks generality and/or is inconvenient. R.A.G. Seely's modeling of various impredicative theories, such as system F is an example of the usefulness of categorical semantics.

It was found that the connectives of pre-categorical logic were more clearly understood using the concept of adjoint functor, and that the quantifiers were also best understood using adjoint functors.

Internal languages This can be seen as a formalization and generalization of proof by diagram chasing. One defines a suitable internal language naming relevant constituents of a category, and then applies categorical semantics to turn assertions in a logic over the internal language into corresponding categorical statements. This has been most successful in the theory of toposes, where the internal language of a topos together with the semantics of intuitionistic higher-order logic in a topos enables one to reason about the objects and morphisms of a topos "as if they were sets and functions". This has been successful in dealing with toposes that have "sets" with properties incompatible with classical logic. A prime example is Dana Scott's model of untyped lambda calculus in terms of objects that retract onto their own function space. Another is the Moggi–Hyland model of system F by an internal full subcategory of the effective topos of Martin Hyland.
Term-model constructions In many cases, the categorical semantics of a logic provide a basis for establishing a correspondence between theories in the logic and instances of an appropriate kind of category. A classic example is the correspondence between theories of βη-equational logic over simply typed lambda calculus and Cartesian closed categories. Categories arising from theories via term-model constructions can usually be characterized up to equivalence by a suitable universal property. This has enabled proofs of meta-theoretical properties of some logics by means of an appropriate categorical algebra. For instance, Freyd gave a proof of the existence and disjunction properties of intuitionistic logic this way.

See also
 History of topos theory

Notes

References
Books

Seminal papers

Further reading 

 Fairly accessible introduction, but somewhat dated. The categorical approach to higher-order logics over polymorphic and dependent types was developed largely after this book was published.
 A comprehensive monograph written by a computer scientist; it covers both first-order and higher-order logics, and also polymorphic and dependent types. The focus is on fibred category as universal tool in categorical logic, which is necessary in dealing with polymorphic and dependent types.
 Version available online at John Bell's homepage.
A preliminary version.

External links

 
Systems of formal logic
Theoretical computer science